Charles H. Heath (November 4, 1829 – July 12, 1889) was a Vermont politician and attorney who served as President of the Vermont Senate.

Biography
Charles Henry Heath was born in Woodbury, Vermont on November 4, 1829.  He graduated from the University of Vermont (UVM) with an AB in 1854 and received an AM from UVM in 1857.  Heath taught and served as a school principal in Morrisville while studying law, attained admission to the bar in 1858, and began a practice in Plainfield.

A Republican, Heath served as Washington County State's Attorney from 1862 to 1864.  He served in the Vermont Senate for three terms beginning in 1868, and was Senate President from 1870 to 1872.

From 1870 to 1871 Heath was a member of the state Board of Agriculture.  He was a trustee of the state library beginning in 1872 and Goddard Seminary from 1875.  From 1887 to 1888 Heath was President of the Vermont Bar Association.

After serving in the State Senate, Heath relocated to Montpelier, where he practiced law until his death.  He died in Barre on July 12, 1889. He was buried at Green Mount Cemetery in Montpelier.

References

External links

1829 births
1889 deaths
People from Woodbury, Vermont
University of Vermont alumni
Vermont lawyers
State's attorneys in Vermont
Republican Party Vermont state senators
Presidents pro tempore of the Vermont Senate
19th-century American politicians
19th-century American lawyers